Katarzyna Kostka (1576–1648) was a Polish–Lithuanian noblewoman.

She married Adam Hieronim Sieniawski around 1598.

1570s births
1648 deaths
Katarzyna Kostka